Northern Territory Cricket, formally the Northern Territory Cricket Association, is the governing body for cricket in the Northern Territory of Australia. Cricket in the Northern Territory has produced state contracted players which include Kane Richardson and Tom Andrews who are both contracted to the South Australia Redbacks.

Affiliations
The association is affiliated with Cricket Australia. The Alice Springs Cricket Association is a member association of Northern Territory Cricket.
Aswell as Darwin and District Cricket, Katherine District Cricket and Tennant Creek Cricket Association.

Competitions
The association supports the management of the Darwin and Districts cricket, Alice Springs, Tennant Creek and Katherine cricket competitions. The annual Imparja Cup Indigenous cricket tournament is hosted by Northern Territory Cricket.

Northern Territory Cricket also support a number of community cricket carnivals that lead up into the Imparja Cup.

Carnivals include the Lingalonga Cup in Batchelor, the Dingo Cup in Timber Creek, the Nitmiluk Cup in Katherine, the Barra Cup in Borroloola, the Wauchope vs the World carnival in Wauchope, the Uluru Cup and the Rossy Williams Shield in Tennant Creek.

References

External links

Gov
Cri
Cricket in the Northern Territory
1978 establishments in Australia
Sports organizations established in 1978